Homostinea is a genus of moths belonging to the family Tineidae.

Species
Homostinea chersadacta Meyrick, 1932
Homostinea curviliniella Dietz, 1905

References

Meessiinae